It Pays to Advertise is a 1931 American pre-Code comedy film, based on the play of the same name by Roi Cooper Megrue and Walter C. Hackett, starring Norman Foster and Carole Lombard, and directed by Frank Tuttle.

Paramount also produced a French-language version of the film titled  (1932), directed by Karl Anton.

Plot
Rodney Martin sets up a soap business to rival his father. With the help of an advertising expert and his secretary, Mary, he develops a successful marketing campaign. His father ends up buying the company from him, while Rodney and Mary fall in love.

Cast
Norman Foster as Rodney Martin
Carole Lombard as Mary Grayson
Richard 'Skeets' Gallagher as Ambrose Pearle
Eugene Pallette as Cyrus Martin
Lucien Littlefield as Adams
Judith Wood as Countess de Beaurien (credited as Helen Johnson)
Louise Brooks as Thelma Temple
Morgan Wallace as L. R. McChesney
Tom Kennedy as Perkins
Marcia Manners as Miss Burke
Frank Coghlan Jr. as Office Boy (credited as Junior Coghlan)
John Howell as Johnson
John Sinclair as Window Cleaner

Reception
The film received positive reviews. Photoplay wrote that it has "plenty of speed and lots of laughs", and praised the "perfect cast".

See also
It Pays to Advertise (1919)
It Pays to Advertise (1936)

References

External links

1931 films
1931 romantic comedy films
American romantic comedy films
American black-and-white films
1930s English-language films
American films based on plays
Films directed by Frank Tuttle
Paramount Pictures films
Films about advertising
Remakes of American films
Sound film remakes of silent films
American multilingual films
1931 multilingual films
1930s American films